The 2008–09 Philadelphia Flyers season was the Flyers' 42nd season in the National Hockey League (NHL). The Flyers lost in the first round of the playoffs to the Pittsburgh Penguins in six games.

Regular season
The Flyers began the 2008–09 season by naming Mike Richards the 17th captain in Flyers history on September 17, with Jason Smith headed to the Ottawa Senators as a free agent. The Flyers were looking to build on the success of the previous season, but instead got off to an 0–3–3 start which became indicative of the season ahead. Despite a solid December and January, and finishing with four points more than the year before, for the most part the 2008–09 Flyers were an inconsistent unit, playing at the top of their ability one night while subpar the next. Defenseman Derian Hatcher missed the entire regular season and playoffs with a knee injury, and Steve Downie was traded to the Tampa Bay Lightning for defenseman Matt Carle. Two pleasant surprises were the emergence of rookie center Claude Giroux and defenseman Luca Sbisa, who was drafted by the Flyers in June with the 19th overall pick acquired from the Columbus Blue Jackets in exchange for R. J. Umberger, the victim of a salary cap crunch. Scottie Upshall also found himself the victim of such a crunch, traded to the Phoenix Coyotes for Daniel Carcillo at the trade deadline.

Despite holding on to the fourth seed in the Eastern Conference for much of the season, due to a 4–5–1 finish to the season, highlighted by a home loss to the New York Rangers on the last day of the regular season, the Flyers slipped to the fifth seed and lost home-ice advantage in their first round series with the Pittsburgh Penguins.

The Flyers finished the regular season having scored the most shorthanded goals in the NHL, with 16, and having allowed the fewest shorthanded goals, with just one.

Divisional standings

Conference standings

Playoffs
Pittsburgh dominated the Flyers in Game 1, and despite a better effort by the Flyers in Game 2, Pittsburgh came to Philadelphia with a 2–0 series lead. The Flyers were the better team in Games 3 and 4, but Pittsburgh gained a split in Philadelphia and took a 3–1 series lead. After a decisive 3–0 win in Game 5, the Flyers jumped out to a 3–0 lead in Game 6, but promptly fell victim to the inconsistencies that plagued the team all season and gave up five unanswered goals in a season-ending 5–3 loss.

Schedule and results

Preseason

|- style="background:#cfc;"
| 1 || September 22 || New Jersey Devils || 4–1 || 17,108 || 1–0–0 ||
|- style="background:#fcf;"
| 2 || September 24 || @ Ottawa Senators || 1–3 || 17,038 || 1–1–0 ||
|- style="background:#cfc;"
| 3 || September 25 || New York Islanders || 4–5 || 7,706 || 2–1–0 ||
|- style="background:#cfc;"
| 4 || September 27 || Carolina Hurricanes || 4–2|| 17,700 || 3–1–0 ||
|- style="background:#fcf;"
| 5 || September 28 || @ Carolina Hurricanes || 0–1 || 11,265 || 3–2–0 ||
|- style="background:#cfc;"
| 6 || October 1 || Washington Capitals || 2–1 || 17,523 || 4–2–0 ||
|- style="background:#fcf;"
| 7 || October 3 || @ Washington Capitals || 1–5 || 14,864 || 4–3–0 ||
|- style="background:#fcf;"
| 8 || October 4 || @ New Jersey Devils || 0–1 || 9,558 || 4–4–0 ||
|- style="background:#fcf;"
| 9 || October 7 || @ Philadelphia Phantoms || 2–4 || 17,077 || 4–5–0 ||
|-
| colspan="7" style="text-align:center;"|
Notes:
 Game played at John Labatt Centre in London, Ontario.
 Game played at Wachovia Spectrum in Philadelphia, Pennsylvania.
|-

|-
| Legend:

Regular season

|- style="background:#fcf;"
| 1 || October 11 || NY Rangers || 4–3 || Philadelphia ||  || Biron || 19,623 || 0–1–0 || 0 || 
|- style="background:#fcf;"
| 2 || October 13 || Montreal || 5–3 || Philadelphia ||  || Biron || 19,323 || 0–2–0 || 0 || 
|- style="background:#ffc;"
| 3 || October 14 || Philadelphia || 2–3 || Pittsburgh || OT || Niittymaki || 16,965 || 0–2–1 || 1 || 
|- style="background:#fcf;"
| 4 || October 16 || Philadelphia || 2–5 || Colorado ||  || Biron || 18,007 || 0–3–1 || 1 || 
|- style="background:#ffc;"
| 5 || October 18 || Philadelphia || 4–5 || San Jose || OT || Niittymaki || 17,496 || 0–3–2 || 2 || 
|- style="background:#ffc;"
| 6 || October 22 || San Jose || 7–6 || Philadelphia || SO || Biron || 19,072 || 0–3–3 || 3 || 
|- style="background:#cfc;"
| 7 || October 24 || Philadelphia || 6–3 || New Jersey ||  || Biron || 15,529 || 1–3–3 || 5 || 
|- style="background:#cfc;"
| 8 || October 25 || New Jersey || 2–3 || Philadelphia || OT || Biron || 19,611 || 2–3–3 || 7 || 
|- style="background:#cfc;"
| 9 || October 28 || Philadelphia || 7–0 || Atlanta ||  || Niittymaki ||13,207 || 3–3–3 || 9 || 
|- style="background:#cfc;"
| 10 || October 30 || NY Islanders || 2–3 || Philadelphia || OT || Biron ||18,227 || 4–3–3|| 11 || 
|-

|- style="background:#fcf;"
| 11 || November 2 || Edmonton || 5–4 || Philadelphia ||  || Biron || 19,437|| 4–4–3 || 11 || 
|- style="background:#fcf;"
| 12 || November 6 || Philadelphia ||1–4 || Ottawa ||  ||Niittymaki ||18,938 ||4–5–3 || 11 || 
|- style="background:#fcf;"
| 13 || November 8 || Tampa Bay || 2–1 || Philadelphia ||  || Biron ||19,412 || 4–6–3 || 11 || 
|- style="background:#cfc;"
| 14 || November 11 || Philadelphia || 3–1 || NY Islanders ||  || Biron || 13,447 || 5–6–3 || 13 || 
|- style="background:#ffc;"
| 15 || November 13 || Philadelphia || 4–5 || Pittsburgh || SO || Biron  || 17,132 || 5–6–4 || 14 || 
|- style="background:#cfc;"
| 16 || November 15 || Philadelphia || 2–1 || Montreal ||  || Biron ||21,273 || 6–6–4 || 16 || 
|- style="background:#cfc;"
| 17 || November 16 || Atlanta || 3–4|| Philadelphia ||  || Niittymaki||19,437 || 7–6–4 || 18 || 
|- style="background:#cfc;"
| 18 || November 21 || Philadelphia || 3–0 || Buffalo ||  ||Biron ||18,256 || 8–6–4 || 20 || 
|- style="background:#cfc;"
| 19 || November 22 || Phoenix || 3–4 || Philadelphia || OT ||Biron || 19,520|| 9–6–4|| 22 || 
|- style="background:#cfc;"
| 20 || November 24 || Dallas || 3–4 || Philadelphia ||  || Biron || 19,171|| 10–6–4 || 24 || 
|- style="background:#cfc;"
| 21 || November 26 || Philadelphia || 3–1 || Carolina ||  || Niittymaki||15,057 || 11–6–4 || 26 || 
|- style="background:#ffc;"
| 22 || November 28 || Carolina || 2–3 || Philadelphia || OT || Biron || 19,587 || 11–6–5 ||27 || 
|- style="background:#fcf;"
| 23 || November 29 || Philadelphia || 2–4 || Toronto ||  ||Biron ||19,387 || 11–7–5 ||27 || 
|-

|- style="background:#cfc;"
| 24 || December 2 || Tampa Bay ||3–4 || Philadelphia || OT ||Biron ||19,227 ||12–7–5 || 29 || 
|- style="background:#ffc;"
| 25 || December 4 || New Jersey ||3–2 || Philadelphia || OT || Biron || 19,577||12–7–6 ||30 || 
|- style="background:#cfc;"
| 26 || December 6 || Philadelphia ||2–1 || Carolina || OT || Niittymaki||14,061 ||13–7–6 ||32 || 
|- style="background:#cfc;"
| 27 || December 9 || NY Islanders ||3–4 || Philadelphia ||  ||Biron ||19,037 ||14–7–6 || 34 || 
|- style="background:#cfc;"
| 28 || December 11 || Carolina ||5–6 || Philadelphia || SO ||Niittymaki ||19,057 ||15–7–6 ||36 || 
|- style="background:#cfc;"
| 29 || December 13 || Pittsburgh ||3–6 || Philadelphia ||  ||Biron ||19,811 ||16–7–6 || 38 || 
|- style="background:#cfc;"
| 30 || December 16 || Colorado ||2–5 || Philadelphia ||  ||Niittymaki ||19,219 ||17–7–6 || 40 || 
|- style="background:#fcf;"
| 31 || December 18 || Philadelphia ||2–5 || Montreal ||  ||Niittymaki || 21,273 ||17–8–6 || 40 || 
|- style="background:#cfc;"
| 32 || December 20 || Washington ||1–7 || Philadelphia ||  ||Niittymaki ||19,897 ||18–8–6 || 42 || 
|- style="background:#ffc;"
| 33 || December 21 || Philadelphia ||2–3 || New Jersey ||SO  ||Niittymaki ||14,426 ||18–8–7 ||43 || 
|- style="background:#cfc;"
| 34 || December 23 || Ottawa || 4–6 || Philadelphia ||  || Nittymaki || 19,578 || 19–8–7 || 45 || 
|- style="background:#fcf;"
| 35 || December 26 || Philadelphia ||1–5 || Chicago ||  || Biron ||22,712 ||19–9–7 || 45 || 
|- style="background:#fcf;"
| 36 || December 27 || Philadelphia ||0–3 || Columbus ||  || Niittymaki||18,402 ||19–10–7 ||45 || 
|- style="background:#cfc;"
| 37 || December 30 || Philadelphia ||3–2 || Vancouver ||  || Biron ||18,630 ||20–10–7 ||47 || 
|-

|- style="background:#cfc;"
| 38 || January 2 || Philadelphia ||5–4 || Anaheim || SO || Biron || 17,597 || 21–10–7 || 49 || 
|- style="background:#ffc;"
| 39 || January 3 || Philadelphia ||1–2 || Los Angeles || SO || Niittymaki || 18,118||21–10–8 ||50 || 
|- style="background:#ffc;"
| 40 || January 6 || Philadelphia ||1–2 || Washington || SO ||Biron ||18,277 ||21–10–9 ||51 || 
|- style="background:#cfc;"
| 41 || January 8 || Minnesota ||1–3 || Philadelphia ||  ||Biron ||19,596 ||22–10–9 ||53 || 
|- style="background:#cfc;"
| 42 || January 10 || Toronto ||1–4 || Philadelphia || ||Biron ||19,787 ||23–10–9 ||55 || 
|- style="background:#fcf;"
| 43 || January 13 || Pittsburgh || 4–2 || Philadelphia ||  ||Biron||19,872 ||23–11–9 ||55 || 
|- style="background:#fcf;"
| 44 || January 15 || Philadelphia || 1–4|| Tampa Bay ||  ||Biron ||15,604  ||23–12–9 || 55 || 
|- style="background:#cfc;"
| 45 || January 16 || Philadelphia ||3–2 || Florida || SO ||Niittymaki ||17,827 ||24–12–9 ||57 || 
|- style="background:#cfc;"
| 46 || January 21 || Atlanta ||3–5 || Philadelphia ||  ||Niittymaki ||19,766 ||25–12–9 || 59 || 
|- style="background:#fcf;"
| 47 || January 27 || Philadelphia || 2–3 || Florida ||  ||Biron || 13,904||25–13–9 || 59 || 
|- style="background:#cfc;"
| 48 || January 30 || Philadelphia ||6–1 || Tampa Bay ||  || Niittymaki ||18,120 || 26–13–9||  61 || 
|- style="background:#fcf;"
| 49 || January 31 || Philadelphia ||0–4 || St. Louis ||  ||Niittymaki ||19,150 ||26–14–9 ||61 || 
|-

|- style="background:#fcf;"
| 50 || February 4 || Boston || 3–1 || Philadelphia ||  ||Biron ||19,748 || 26–15–9|| 61 || 
|- style="background:#cfc;"
| 51 || February 7 || Philadelphia || 4–3|| Boston || OT ||Niittymaki ||17,565 || 27–15–9|| 63 || 
|- style="background:#cfc;"
| 52 || February 8 || Philadelphia ||3–2 || Atlanta ||  ||Niittymaki ||14,175|| 28–15–9||65 || 
|- style="background:#fcf;"
| 53 || February 12 || Ottawa ||5–2|| Philadelphia ||  ||Niittymaki ||19,679 ||28–16–9 ||65 || 
|- style="background:#cfc;"
| 54 || February 14 || NY Islanders ||1–5 || Philadelphia ||  ||Biron ||19,789 ||29–16–9 ||67 || 
|- style="background:#cfc;"
| 55 || February 15 || Philadelphia ||5–2 || NY Rangers ||  ||Biron ||18,200 ||30–16–9 || 69 || 
|- style="background:#cfc;"
| 56 || February 19 || Buffalo ||3–6 || Philadelphia ||  ||Biron ||19,642 ||31–16–9 ||71 || 
|- style="background:#fcf;"
| 57 || February 21 || Pittsburgh ||5–4 || Philadelphia ||  ||Biron ||19,992 ||31–17–9 ||71 || 
|- style="background:#cfc;"
| 58 || February 24 || Philadelphia || 4–2|| Washington ||  || Biron|| 18,277||32–17–9 || 73 || 
|- style="background:#cfc;"
| 59 || February 25 || Los Angeles ||0–2 || Philadelphia ||  ||Biron ||19,568 ||33–17–9 || 75 || 
|- style="background:#ffc;"
| 60 || February 27 || Montreal || 4–3 || Philadelphia || OT ||Niittymaki ||19,881 ||33–17–10 || 76 || 
|-

|- style="background:#fcf;"
| 61 || March 1 || Philadelphia || 0–3 || New Jersey ||  ||Biron ||17,625 ||33–18–10 || 76 || 
|- style="background:#cfc;"
| 62 || March 3 || Philadelphia ||4–2 || Boston ||  ||Niittymaki ||17,020 ||34–18–10 || 78 || 
|- style="background:#fcf;"
| 63 || March 5 || Calgary || 5–1 || Philadelphia || ||Niittymaki || 19,513|| 34–19–10|| 78 || 
|- style="background:#cfc;"
| 64 || March 7 || Nashville ||1–4 || Philadelphia || ||Biron || 19,611|| 35–19–10 || 80 || 
|- style="background:#cfc;"
| 65 || March 10 || Buffalo ||2–5 || Philadelphia || || Biron ||19,421 ||36–19–10 || 82 || 
|- style="background:#fcf;"
| 66 || March 12 || Washington ||2–1 || Philadelphia || ||Biron || 19,728 ||36–20–10 || 82 || 
|- style="background:#cfc;"
| 67 || March 14 || NY Rangers ||2–4 || Philadelphia ||  ||Biron || 19,836 || 37–20–10 || 84 || 
|- style="background:#fcf;"
| 68 || March 15 || Philadelphia || 1–4|| NY Rangers ||  ||Niittymaki ||18,200 || 37–21–10|| 84 || 
|- style="background:#fcf;"
| 69 || March 17 || Philadelphia ||2–3 || Detroit ||  ||Biron ||20,066 ||37–22–10 || 84 || 
|- style="background:#cfc;"
| 70 || March 20 || Philadelphia ||6–4 || Buffalo ||  ||Biron ||18,690 ||38–22–10 || 86 || 
|- style="background:#cfc;"
| 71 || March 22 || Philadelphia ||3–1 || Pittsburgh ||  ||Biron ||17,132 ||39–22–10 || 88 || 
|- style="background:#cfc;"
| 72 || March 23 || New Jersey ||2–4 || Philadelphia ||  ||Biron ||19,762 ||40–22–10 || 90 || 
|- style="background:#fcf;"
| 73 || March 26 || Florida  ||4–2 || Philadelphia ||  || Biron ||19,631 || 40–23–10|| 90 || 
|- style="background:#cfc;"
| 74 || March 28 || Philadelphia ||4–3 || NY Islanders || SO ||Biron ||16,234 ||41–23–10 || 92 || 
|- style="background:#fcf;"
| 75 || March 29 || Boston || 4–3|| Philadelphia ||  || Niittymaki||19,715 ||41–24–10 || 92 || 
|-

|- style="background:#fcf;"
| 76 || April 1 || Philadelphia || 2–3 || Toronto ||  || Biron ||19,340 ||41–25–10 || 92 || 
|- style="background:#cfc;"
| 77 || April 3 || Toronto || 5–8|| Philadelphia ||  || Biron ||19,727 ||42–25–10 || 94 || 
|- style="background:#ffc;"
| 78 || April 4 || Philadelphia ||3–4 || Ottawa || SO || Niittymaki||19,557 ||42–25–11 || 95 || 
|- style="background:#cfc;"
| 79 || April 7 || Florida ||1–2 || Philadelphia ||  || Biron||19,637 ||43–25–11 || 97 || 
|- style="background:#fcf;"
| 80 || April 9 || Philadelphia ||1–2 || NY Rangers ||  ||Biron ||18,200 ||43–26–11 ||97 || 
|- style="background:#cfc;"
| 81 || April 11 || Philadelphia || 3–2|| NY Islanders ||  || Biron ||16,234 ||44–26–11 || 99 || 
|- style="background:#fcf;"
| 82 || April 12 || NY Rangers || 4–3|| Philadelphia ||  || Biron ||19,648 ||44–27–11 || 99 || 
|-

|-
| Legend:

Playoffs

|- style="background:#fcf;"
| 1 || April 15|| Philadelphia || 1–4 || Pittsburgh || || Biron || 17,132 || Penguins lead 1–0 || 
|- style="background:#fcf;"
| 2 || April 17 || Philadelphia || 2–3 || Pittsburgh || OT || Biron || 17,132 || Penguins lead 2–0 || 
|- style="background:#cfc;"
| 3 || April 19 || Pittsburgh || 3–6 || Philadelphia ||  || Biron || 19,745 || Penguins lead 2–1 || 
|- style="background:#fcf;"
| 4 || April 21 || Pittsburgh || 3–1 || Philadelphia || || Biron || 19,883 || Penguins lead 3–1 || 
|- style="background:#cfc;"
| 5 || April 23 || Philadelphia || 3–0 || Pittsburgh || || Biron || 17,132 || Penguins lead 3–2 || 
|- style="background:#fcf;"
| 6 || April 25 || Pittsburgh || 5–3 || Philadelphia || || Biron || 20,072 || Penguins win 4–2 || 
|-

|-
| Legend:

Player statistics

Scoring
 Position abbreviations: C = Center; D = Defense; G = Goaltender; LW = Left Wing; RW = Right Wing
  = Joined team via a transaction (e.g., trade, waivers, signing) during the season. Stats reflect time with the Flyers only.
  = Left team via a transaction (e.g., trade, waivers, release) during the season. Stats reflect time with the Flyers only.

Goaltending

Awards and records

Awards

Records

Among the team records set during the 2008–09 season was Simon Gagne tying the team record for most shorthanded goals in a single game on November 13. On December 20, Scott Hartnell tied the team record with three goals scored in a single period. On the season, Mike Richards tied the team record for most shorthanded goals (7) and Jeff Carter tied the mark for most game-winning goals (12). The one shorthanded goal allowed by the Flyers during the season is the fewest in franchise history.

Milestones

Transactions
The Flyers were involved in the following transactions from June 5, 2008, the day after the deciding game of the 2008 Stanley Cup Finals, through June 12, 2009, the day of the deciding game of the 2009 Stanley Cup Finals.

Trades

Players acquired

Players lost

Signings

Draft picks

Philadelphia's picks at the 2008 NHL Entry Draft, which was held at Scotiabank Place in Ottawa, Ontario on June 20–21, 2008. The Flyers traded their originally allotted second, third, fifth, and seventh-round picks in four separate trades.

Farm teams
American Hockey League – Philadelphia Phantoms (Standings)
The 2008–09 season was the Phantoms' last playing in the Wachovia Spectrum and means they will move following the season. Comcast Spectacor sold the Phantoms to the Brooks Group of Pittsburgh on February 4, 2009, and the new ownership has expressed interest in eventually moving the Phantoms to Allentown provided that a multi-purpose arena can be constructed there. Until a permanent new home is found for the club it will have to operate starting in 2009–10 in a temporary location. The site being given the most serious consideration for that is Glen Falls, the former home of the AHL Adirondack Red Wings from 1979 to 1999. Comcast Spectacor continues to operate the team through the conclusion of the 2008–09 AHL season and playoffs.

With Craig Berube returning to his role as an assistant coach with the Flyers, John Paddock was named head coach of the Phantoms. The Phantoms trailed the Binghamton Senators by as many as 12 points on March 14 for the final playoff spot in the East Division, but came back to overtake Binghamton and clinch the final playoff spot in the final regular season game at the Spectrum. The Phantoms final season in Philadelphia came to an end after being swept from the first round of the playoffs by the Hershey Bears.

ECHL – Mississippi Sea Wolves (Standings)
Mississippi missed the ECHL playoffs and announced they would suspend operations for the 2009–10 season.

Notes

References
General
 
 
 
Specific

External links

 Philadelphia Flyers Historical Salaries from CapGeek.com

2008-09
2008–09 NHL season by team
2008–09 in American ice hockey by team
Philadelphia
Philadelphia